The 1965 LPGA Championship was the eleventh LPGA Championship, held September 23–26 at Stardust Country Club in Las Vegas, Nevada.

Sandra Haynie, age 22, won the first of her two LPGA Championship titles, one stroke ahead of runner-up Clifford Ann Creed. In her fifth season on tour, it was the seventh win for Haynie and the first of her four career major victories. Defending champion Mary Mills was twelve strokes back, in a tie for seventh.

It was the fifth of six consecutive LPGA Championships at Stardust, which opened four years earlier. After several ownership and name changes, it became Las Vegas National Golf Club in 1998.

Past champions in the field

Source:
Four-time champion Mickey Wright (1958, 1960, 1961, 1963) did not compete due to a wrist injury.

Final leaderboard
Sunday, September 26, 1965

Source:

References

External links
Golf Stats  leaderboard
Las Vegas National Golf Club 

Women's PGA Championship
Golf in Las Vegas
LPGA Championship
LPGA Championship
LPGA Championship
LPGA Championship
Women's sports in Nevada